Peshev Ridge (Peshev Rid \'pe-shev 'rid\) is a crescent-shaped ridge in central Tangra Mountains extending  along the northeast coast of Brunow Bay and southeast of Macy Glacier, Livingston Island in the South Shetland Islands, Antarctica. Its east extremity is formed by the summit St. Naum Peak, separated from Balchik Ridge to the east by Starosel Gate.  The ridge was named in honour of Dimitar Peshev (1894–1973), who led the nationwide campaign that kept Bulgaria’s Jews safe during the Holocaust.

Location

Maps
 South Shetland Islands. Scale 1:200000 topographic map. DOS 610 Sheet W 62 60. Tolworth, UK, 1968.
 Islas Livingston y Decepción.  Mapa topográfico a escala 1:100000.  Madrid: Servicio Geográfico del Ejército, 1991.
 S. Soccol, D. Gildea and J. Bath. Livingston Island, Antarctica. Scale 1:100000 satellite map. The Omega Foundation, USA, 2004.
 L.L. Ivanov et al., Antarctica: Livingston Island and Greenwich Island, South Shetland Islands (from English Strait to Morton Strait, with illustrations and ice-cover distribution), 1:100000 scale topographic map, Antarctic Place-names Commission of Bulgaria, Sofia, 2005
 L.L. Ivanov. Antarctica: Livingston Island and Greenwich, Robert, Snow and Smith Islands. Scale 1:120000 topographic map. Troyan: Manfred Wörner Foundation, 2010.  (First edition 2009. )
 Antarctic Digital Database (ADD). Scale 1:250000 topographic map of Antarctica. Scientific Committee on Antarctic Research (SCAR), 1993–2016.

References
 Peshev Ridge. SCAR Composite Gazetteer of Antarctica.
 Bulgarian Antarctic Gazetteer. Antarctic Place-names Commission. (details in Bulgarian, basic data in English)

External links
 Peshev Ridge. Copernix satellite image

Ridges of Livingston Island